Brachyopa vernalis is a species of hoverfly.

Distribution
Crete.

References

Diptera of Europe
Eristalinae
Insects described in 2014